Angie Hicks is the Chief Customer Officer of ANGI Homeservices Inc. and the eponymous co-founder of Angie's List (now known as Angi).

Early life and education 
Hicks grew up in Fort Wayne, Indiana. She earned a Bachelor of Arts degree in Economics from DePauw University, and also earned a Master of Business Administration from Harvard Business School, after Angie's List had been established.

Career 
Hicks interned during college at CID Equity Partners, a venture capital firm where she met venture capitalist Bill Oesterle. In 1995, Oesterle hired Hicks to start Columbus Neighbors, a call-in service and publication with reviews of local home and lawn services in Columbus, Ohio. After Hicks recruited over 1,000 members in one year, the company was renamed Angie's List. In 1996, it acquired Unified Neighbors, a similar company in Indianapolis, then moved Angie's List's headquarters to that city in 1999.

In 2017, IAC announced its plans to acquire Angie's List and combine it with IAC's HomeAdvisor to form a new publicly-traded company called ANGI Homeservices Inc. Hicks became the Chief Customer Officer of ANGI Homeservices Inc., a digital marketplace service that connects consumers with service professionals for home repair, maintenance and improvement projects. As of July 2016, Angie's List offered more than 10 million verified reviews of local service providers in over 700 service categories.

Hicks is a member of the Techpoint Board of Directors and a co-founder and past member of the Board of Directors of The Governor Bob Orr Indiana Entrepreneurial Fellowship Program. She was a member of the Indianapolis Chamber of Commerce Board of Directors until 2016.

References 

Year of birth missing (living people)
Living people
21st-century American businesspeople
American Internet company founders
American technology company founders
American technology executives
American women company founders
Businesspeople in technology
People from Fort Wayne, Indiana
DePauw University alumni
Harvard Business School alumni
21st-century American businesswomen